George Dahm (July 11, 1916 – August 9, 1980) was an American rower. He competed in the men's coxless pair event at the 1936 Summer Olympics.

References

External links
 

1916 births
1980 deaths
American male rowers
Olympic rowers of the United States
Rowers at the 1936 Summer Olympics
Rowers from Philadelphia